The men's 1500 metre freestyle competition of the swimming events at the 1955 Pan American Games took place on 20 March. The last Pan American Games champion was Tetsuo Okamoto of Brazil.

This race consisted of thirty lengths of the pool, all lengths being in freestyle.

Results
All times are in minutes and seconds.

Heats

Final 
The final was held on March 20.

References

Swimming at the 1955 Pan American Games